, formerly known as , was a Japanese idol group originally formed on August 2, 2006, with six girls from Hello! Project's trainee group, Hello Pro Egg. After releasing several indie singles, they graduated from trainee status on October 7, 2007, and debuted as part of Nice Girl Project!. In 2014, they participated in supergroup Team Makenki with You Kikkawa and Up Up Girls Kakko Kari.

After Nice Girl Project!'s activities ended in 2015, they were transferred to Up-Front Works and changed their name to "Ciao Bella Cinquetti" following the release of their new single on July 8. They disbanded on August 2, 2018.

History

2006-2008: Indies era
The Possible was announced as a trainee unit on August 2, 2006, during the stage play Cry For Help at the Tsunku Town Theater. Kanami Morozuka, Aina Hashimoto, and Yurika Akiyama, three girls from Hello! Project's trainee group, Hello Pro Egg, were announced as members of the group. Kaede Ohse was announced as a member in September 2006, while Robin Shoko Okada and Yuki Goto were added to the group on October 1, 2006. While performing as back-up dancers for Hello! Project's concerts, The Possible released their first indies single, "Young Days!", on October 22, 2006, followed by with "Hatsukoi no Kakera" on December 10.

In 2007, The Possible graduated from trainee status and debuted under Tsunku's newest supergroup, Nice Girl Project!

2008-2014: Major label debut, Nice Girl Project!
Kaede Ohse announced in her blog on June 6, 2009, that she would be leaving The Possible and Nice Girl Project! on August 22 to focus on her studies. She withdrew from activities on June 15.

On April 4, 2013, Robin Shoko Okada announced on her blog that she had been named leader of The Possible.

2015-2018: Label change and disbandment
In 2015, Nice Girl Project!'s activities ended and The Possible were transferred to Up-Front Works, changing their name to "Ciao Bella Cinquetti" with the release of their single, "Omotesandou/Futakotamagawa/Never Never Give Up". On August 10, Yurika Akiyama left the group.

Ciao Bella Cinquetti released a statement on April 24, 2018, mentioning that they were disbanding in August. They performed at Team Makenki's final concert in July and held their final concert on August 2 with Ohse and Akiyama appearing as special guests.

Discography

Albums

Studio albums

Extended plays

Compilation albums

Singles

Indies

Major

Collaboration Singles
[2014.09.17] "Mugen, Fly High!!" Team Makenki
[2012.03.21] "Playball" Mikage Masahide with Razz Like Air / THE Possible & Ogawa Mana
[2010.06.02] "Yabe~Nabe~ na Atsuryoku Be~na~" with Oto no Moto (Fujii Takashi & Tsubaki Oniyakko)
[2007.05.16] "Tawawa Natsu Bikini" with Tokito Ami

Live Singles
[2012.12.01] "Zenryoku Banzai! My Glory!" (全力バンザーイ!My Glory!)
[2012.02.25] "Sakurairo no Romantic"
[2012.01.15] "Kibou to Seishun no Hikari ~Come on! Pika! Pika!~"
[2011.11.25] "Shiawase Hanabi Go Go GOOO! ~Buchinomese! Dai Pinch!~"

DVDs

Concert DVDs
[2012.05.27] The Possible Tandoku Live 2012 Shiawase no Akashi (THE ポッシボー 単独ライブ2012 幸せの証)
[2009.07.04] The Possible Live 2009 Haru: Shiawase no Katachi Kansha no Katachi (THE ポッシボーライブ2009春～幸せの形　感謝の形～)
[2009.01.30] The Possible 2008 Aki: SEXY Generation (THE ポッシボー 2008秋～SEXY ジェネレーション～)
[2008.05.17] The Possible Live Document DVD -2008.3.3 Yokohama Blitz ~Yokohama ☆ Koi no Catch Ball~ Hatsu Tandoku Live e no Michi- (THE ポッシボー　ライブドキュメントDVD-2008.3.3横浜BLITZ～横浜☆恋のキャッチボー～初単独ライブへの道-)
[2007.09.19] The Possible Hatsu Shuen Kouen!! (THE ポッシボー初主演公演！！)
[2007.09.19] Tokito Ami with The Possible Live '07 ~Ami Kore Possi Kore (~時東ぁみ with THE ポッシボー ライブ'07~ぁみコレ ポッシコレ~)

Hello! Project Concert DVDs
[2007.09.26] Dai 1 Kai Hello! Project Shinjin Kouen: Saru no Koku / Tori no Koku
[2007.03.28] Hello! Project 2007 Winter: Shuuketsu! 10th Anniversary
 2007: 2007 Hello! Project Shinjin Koen 8gatsu: Yokohama de Aimasho

Puplications

Photobooks
[2008.08.25] Baribari Mizugi de Possible! (バリバリ水着DEポッシボー！)
[2007.07.13] Doki Doki Possible (ドキ☆ドキ☆ポッシボー)
[2007.07.13] Kyapi Kyapi Possible (キャピ♡キャピ♡ポッシボー)

References

External links
 
 

Japanese girl groups
Japanese idol groups
Japanese pop music groups
Musical groups established in 2006
Musical groups disestablished in 2018
Musical groups from Tokyo
Nice Girl Project!